Yasin Çelik  (born 8 April 1975) is a Turkish football player. He currently plays fullback for Kartalspor in the TFF First League.

Club career
Çelik has appeared in over 180 matches in the Turkish Süper Lig, primarily for Konyaspor.

International career
Çelik has made one appearance for the full Turkey national football team in a friendly against Russia on April 22, 1998.

References

External links
 
 Guardian's Stats Centre

1975 births
Living people
Sportspeople from Adapazarı
Association football defenders
Turkish footballers
Turkey international footballers
Sakaryaspor footballers
MKE Ankaragücü footballers
Konyaspor footballers
Kartalspor footballers